Szár is a village in Fejér county, Hungary.

Famous residents
 Frank Hasenfratz (1935–2022), Hungarian-born Canadian billionaire businessman, founder of Linamar

External links 

 Street map 

Populated places in Fejér County